CFCA-FM is a Canadian radio station broadcasting at 105.3 FM in Kitchener, Ontario. The station currently plays a Top 40/CHR format branded as 105.3 Virgin Radio and is owned by Bell Media.

CFCA's studios and offices are located in Waterloo, and their transmitter is on Baden Hill (also known as the Baden Tower), just west of the Kitchener city limits.

History
CFCA was first launched on 106.1 FM in 1949 by local broadcaster Carl Pollock. It was the first FM radio station in Canada to operate independently, without an AM sister station. Due to the limited audience reach of FM radio at the time, however, the station left the air in 1951. Pollock subsequently launched television station CKCO-TV in 1954 and AM radio station CKKW in 1959, and then relaunched CFCA in 1967 as an easy listening station. Pollock's broadcast holdings became part of Electrohome in 1970.

CFCA and CKKW were tentatively sold in 1992 to a local consortium consisting of Jack Schoone, a former local radio announcer, and Irving Zucker, a former owner of competing stations CKGL and CHYM-FM, but the deal fell through and the stations were instead acquired by CHUM Radio in 1993. By then the station had migrated from its beautiful music/easy listening sound to a brighter adult contemporary format.

Kool FM (1994-2016)
On August 12, 1994 at Noon, CFCA flipped to classic rock as 105.3 Kool FM.

During the early 2000s, the station added pop/rock songs into their playlist, and shifted towards Hot AC, but retained the rock lean and the "Kool FM" moniker.

CTVglobemedia became the stations' owner when it acquired CHUM Radio in 2007, and is currently owned by Bell Media since 2011.

In 2012, CFCA was slightly rebranded as Kool 105.3, with a new logo and a new slogan "Today's Best Variety".

Virgin Radio (2016-present)
On July 26, 2016, CFCA began stunting with Christmas music, while teasing a change to come that Friday (July 29) at Noon. At that time, CFCA flipped to Top 40/CHR, branded as 105.3 Virgin Radio, making CFCA the 8th station in Canada to utilize the "Virgin Radio" branding. (At the same time as CFCA's flip, CJCH-FM in Halifax rebranded to "Virgin".) The first song on "Virgin" (as well as Halifax's "Virgin") was "This Is What You Came For" by Calvin Harris and Rihanna.

References

External links
 105.3 Virgin Radio
 
 

FCA
FCA
Fca
Radio stations established in 1949
1949 establishments in Ontario
Virgin Radio